Isonomeutis amauropa is a species of moth in the Copromorphidae family. It is endemic to New Zealand where it can be found on both the North and South Islands. I. amauropa inhabits native forest particularly forest dominated by Rimu and native beech trees. The larvae of this species consumes margarodid scale insects that live under the bark of these trees. When mature the larvae pupate in a cocoon made of silk and covered in twigs and frass. This cocoon is normally placed under the bark of the same tree the larvae inhabited. Adults of I. amauropa are on the wing from September to February.

Taxonomy
This species was first described by Edward Meyrick in 1888 using a specimen collected at Mount Manaia in Whangārei in December. In 1928 Alfred Philpott published a paper giving descriptions of the structures of this species including the male genitalia. Also in 1928 George Hudson discussed and illustrated this species in his book The butterflies and moths of New Zealand. Hudson also illustrated this species in his 1939 publication A supplement to the butterflies and moths of New Zealand under the name Isonomeutis restincta. In 1988 J. S. Dugdale discussed this species in his catalogue of New Zealand Lepidoptera. The male holotype specimen is held at the Natural History Museum, London.

Description
 

Meyrick originally described this species as follows:

 
Hudson described the larva of this species as follows:
This species is much darker in appearance than its close relative I. restincta.

Distribution
This species is endemic to New Zealand and is found in the North Island and at the top of the South Island.

Behaviour 
Adults of this species are on the wing from September until February. This moth is a day flying moth and are attracted to light at night. Hudson states that the adults of this species often bask in the sun on top of leaves. Meyrick collected this species at rest on a tree trunk.

Habitat 
This species inhabits native New Zealand forest particularly forest dominated by rimu and native beech trees.

Life cycle
Larvae live under the bark of trees. Pupation takes place in a cocoon constructed out of tough silk and covered with twigs and frass. The cocoon is normally placed in a crevice under the bark of a tree in which the larvae have been inhabiting.

Host species
The larvae are predatory, feeding on margarodid scale insects including Ultracoelostoma assimile, under the bark of trees such as Dacrydium cupressinum and beech.

References

Copromorphidae
Moths of New Zealand
Moths described in 1888
Endemic fauna of New Zealand
Taxa named by Edward Meyrick
Endemic moths of New Zealand